Belle Glade Camp was a census-designated place (CDP) in Palm Beach County, Florida, United States. The population was 1,141 at the 2000 census.

Geography
Belle Glade Camp is located at  (26.659764, -80.682615).

According to the United States Census Bureau, the CDP has a total area of 1.2 km2 (0.5 mi2), all land.

Demographics

As of the census of 2000, there were 1,141 people, 284 households, and 232 families residing in the CDP.  The population density was 917.8/km2 (2,380.3/mi2).  There were 294 housing units at an average density of 236.5/km2 (613.3/mi2).  The racial makeup of the CDP was 13.15% White (1.4% were Non-Hispanic White,) 69.59% African American, 0.35% Native American, 0.18% Pacific Islander, 10.60% from other races, and 6.13% from two or more races. Hispanic or Latino of any race were 23.66% of the population.

There were 284 households, out of which 54.2% had children under the age of 18 living with them, 35.9% were married couples living together, 29.6% had a female householder with no husband present, and 18.0% were non-families. 14.4% of all households were made up of individuals, and 2.5% had someone living alone who was 65 years of age or older.  The average household size was 4.02 and the average family size was 4.35.

In the CDP, the population was spread out, with 46.3% under the age of 18, 11.4% from 18 to 24, 26.3% from 25 to 44, 12.8% from 45 to 64, and 3.2% who were 65 years of age or older.  The median age was 20 years. For every 100 females, there were 89.9 males.  For every 100 females age 18 and over, there were 87.5 males.

The median income for a household in the CDP was $20,278, and the median income for a family was $17,656. Males had a median income of $22,574 versus $15,455 for females. The per capita income for the CDP was $4,995.  About 57.1% of families and 62.1% of the population were below the poverty line, including 70.1% of those under age 18 and 74.1% of those age 65 or over.

As of 2000, English as a first language was spoken by 59.21% of all residents, while French Creole accounted for 25.84% and Spanish was the mother tongue for 14.94% of the population.

Schools
Crestwood Middle, Belle Glade High

References

Former census-designated places in Palm Beach County, Florida
Former census-designated places in Florida